Vincas Basanavičius (August 1, 1861 Ožkabaliai – April 23, 1910 Ožkabaliai) was a Lithuanian farmer and folklorist, the brother of Jonas Basanavičius.

Vincas was primarily a farmer. He had close relations with his brother, and sent his recordings collected around Ožkabaliai and Bartninkai to Jonas for publishing. He collected 700 works of folk tales, 150 songs, and 134 riddles.

The former pantry room in the Jonas Basanavičius House Museum in Ožkabaliai holds the permanent exhibition of the works of Vincas.

Publications
His collections were included in publications by Jonas Basanavičius: 
1898: „Lietuviškos pasakos“ (Lithuanian Folk Tales)
1902: „Ožkabalių dainos“ (Songs from Ožkabaliai)
1903: „Iš gyvenimo vėlių bei velnių“ (From Life of Ghosts and Devils)
1905: „Lietuviškos pasakos įvairios“ (More Lithuanian Folk Tales)

References

1861 births
1910 deaths
Lithuanian folklorists
People from Vilkaviškis District Municipality
Lithuanian folk-song collectors